The Star Screen Award Best Background Music is chosen by a panel of distinguished judges.

Here is a list of the award winners and the films for which they won.

See also 
 Screen Awards 
 Bollywood
 Cinema of India

Background Score